Shahmar (also Romanized as Shāhmār) is a village in Shoja Rural District, in the Central District of Jolfa County, East Azerbaijan Province, Iran. At the 2006 census, its population was 1,161, in 303 families.

References 

Populated places in Jolfa County